Romeo Tirone is an American cinematographer and television director. He is best known for his work on the television series Dexter, for which he was nominated for a Primetime Emmy Award for Outstanding Cinematography for a One-Hour Series in 2008 for the episode "The British Invasion".

Credits

Cinematography
Lowball (1996)
Zoe Loses It (short film) (2000)
L.I.E. (2001)
Date Squad (short film)  (2001)
Nadine in Date Land (TV film) (2005)
12 and Holding (2005)
Cry_Wolf (2005)
Babylon Fields (unsold TV pilot) (2007)
Possible Side Effects (unsold TV pilot) (2009)
Dexter (2007–2011)
True Blood (2009–2013)

Television directing
Dexter (2006–2013)
True Blood (2011–2013)
Red Widow (2013)
Nurse Jackie (2013)
Rectify (2013)
Once Upon a Time in Wonderland (2013)
Sleepy Hollow (2014)
Revenge (2014)
Mind Games (2014)
Constantine (2014-2015)
Once Upon a Time (2014-2016)
Of Kings and Prophets (2016)
Underground (2016)
Blindspot (2016)
Taken (2017-2018)
S.W.A.T. (2018)
Whiskey Cavalier (2019)
The Tick (2019)
The InBetween (2019) 
Manifest (2020-2022)
Paradise Lost (2020)
FBI: Most Wanted (2021)

References

External links

American cinematographers
American television directors
Living people
Place of birth missing (living people)
Year of birth missing (living people)